2001 Emmy Awards may refer to:

 53rd Primetime Emmy Awards, the 2001 Emmy Awards ceremony honoring primetime programming June 2000 – May 2001
 28th Daytime Emmy Awards, the 2001 Emmy Awards ceremony honoring daytime programming during 2000
 29th International Emmy Awards, honoring international programming

Emmy Award ceremonies by year